Gramos is a remote mountain village and a former municipality in Kastoria regional unit, Macedonia, Greece. Since the 2011 local government reform it is part of the Nestorio municipality as a municipal unit. The municipal unit has an area of 59.422 km2. Population 18 (2011). The village is a traditional Aromanian (Vlach) settlement, named after the nearby Gramos mountains to its south. It lies very close to the Albanian border. The source of the river Aliakmonas is near Gramos. It had the smallest population of any municipality in Greece at 28 inhabitants in the 2001 Greek census. It was also the least densely populated community or municipality in Greece, at 0.47 inhabitants/km2. A small road connects Gramos with Nestorio, 20 km to its east. Gramos is the nearest village to Lake Gkistova.

Notable people
 Ioannis Nakitsas (1880–1906), Greek revolutionary of the Macedonian Struggle
 Ioan Nicolidi of Pindus (1737–1828), Aromanian physician and noble in Austria
 Vassilis Rapotikas (1888–1943), Aromanian revolutionary and separatist, one of the leading members of the Aromanian Roman Legion

References

Populated places in Kastoria (regional unit)
Former municipalities in Western Macedonia
Aromanian settlements in Greece